Tsʻün-Lao or Lào Bóc is a Tai language spoken in Lai Châu Province of the Northwest region of Vietnam.

References

Tai languages
Languages of Vietnam